All Square is a 2018 American drama film directed by John Hyams. It stars Michael Kelly, Jesse Ray Sheps, Pamela Adlon. The film won the 2018 Best Narrative Film Award at the SXSW Film Festival.

Premise
John "Zibs" Zbikowski (Michael Kelly) is a down-on-his-luck, small town bookie. He abandoned a promising baseball career in his youth to care for his ailing father Bob (Harris Yulin), whose life fell apart after a fatal DUI. Zibs inherited Bob's sports book, but has difficulty collecting on debts from the small-town locals, often stealing from their houses as collateral. After a one night stand with his high school ex-girlfriend Debbie (Pamela Adlon), Zibs ends up babysitting her 12-year old son Brian (Jesse Ray Sheps) the next day. Zibs reluctantly accepts Brian's invitation to his baseball game, and is inspired to start taking bets on the local Youth League.

The scheme is immediately lucrative for Zibs, though it results in unsightly behavior from the coaches and parents at little league games. Zibs starts spending more time with Brian as well, teaching him to pitch. He also introduces Brian to drinking, gambling, and fighting, and has him act as a lookout during home robberies. Debbie becomes wary of Zibs' influence on her son. With the success of the Youth League sports book, Zibs all but abandons his day job as a sheet rock installer, alienating his friend and colleague Scotty (Isiah Whitlock Jr.). Meanwhile, Matt "Smitty" Smith (Josh Lucas), the Little League commissioner who is running for public office, catches onto Zibs' new sports book scheme and tries to blackmail him into shutting it down. Zibs learns from Brian that Smitty is cheating on his wife with Debbie, and leverages this information to keep Smitty quiet.

Brian becomes disillusioned with Zibs' scheme after seeing the increasingly hostile behavior of the Youth League parents. He deliberately throws a huge game, nearly causing a riot to break out on the baseball field. Smitty cancels the rest of the season and Zibs' clients turn on him. After Zibs and Brian have a falling out, Brian breaks into his estranged father Hooper's house, and Hooper puts him in the hospital. Zibs seeks revenge on Hooper, but Bob talks him down from taking action, revealing that his "DUI" was actually the deliberate murder of a man sleeping with his wife. Zibs reconciles with Brian and abandons the Youth League sports book, but admits his behavior is unlikely to change otherwise.

Cast
 Michael Kelly as John Zbikowski
 Jesse Ray Sheps as Brian
 Pamela Adlon as Debbie
 Isiah Whitlock Jr. as Scotty
 Tom Everett Scott as Adam
 Yeardley Smith as Beaches
 Harris Yulin as Bob
 Josh Lucas as Matt Smith
 Five Novogratz

Release
The film was released on 12 October 2018 in the United States.

References

External links

American drama films
American baseball films
Films about gambling
2010s English-language films
Films directed by John Hyams
2010s American films